Dmytro Viktorovych Kolodin (born 12 April 1978) is a former Ukrainian football midfielder.

Career
Kolodin was born in Kryvyi Rih, Ukrainian SSR, Soviet Union. He began playing football with FC Metalurh Zaporizhzhia's youth side, and would eventually play professional football for the club from 1996 to 1999. He also played in the Ukrainian Premier League for FC Kryvbas Kryvyi Rih.

In 2002 Kolodin went to play in Belarus. He played for Dinamo Minsk and FC Lokomotiv Vitebsk. From 2005 to 2007 he played for Desna Chernihiv, the main team of Chernihiv, with which he took second place in the group of the second league, and here he won the Ukrainian Second League in the season 2005–06 and to get promoted to Ukrainian First League.

In 2008 he returned to Belarus. He played 27 matches for Smorgon, after which he accepted an offer from Dacia Chișinău. He began the 2009 season in Moldova, but returned to Smorgon after the team's financial situation deteriorated. He also spent the next season in two clubs: he started in Uzbekistan's Kyzylkum, and finished in Belarus' Naftan.

The last two years of his career he played in the Ukrainian teams Mykolaiv and Zhemchuzhyna Yalta.

Honours
Desna Chernihiv
 Ukrainian Second League: 2005–06

References

External links 

1978 births
Living people
Ukrainian footballers
Ukrainian expatriate footballers
Expatriate footballers in Belarus
Expatriate footballers in Moldova
Expatriate footballers in Uzbekistan
FC Metalurh Zaporizhzhia players
FC Metalurh-2 Zaporizhzhia players
FC Torpedo Zaporizhzhia players
SSSOR Metalurh Zaporizhzhia players
FC Kryvbas Kryvyi Rih players
FC Kryvbas-2 Kryvyi Rih players
FC Elektrometalurh-NZF Nikopol players
FC Dinamo Minsk players
FC Vitebsk players
FC Desna Chernihiv players
FC Smorgon players
FC Dacia Chișinău players
FC Naftan Novopolotsk players
MFC Mykolaiv players
FC Zhemchuzhyna Yalta players
Association football midfielders
Sportspeople from Kryvyi Rih